Bhuvan Bam (born Bhuvan Avnindra Shankar Bam; 22 January 1994) is an Indian comedian, writer, singer, actor, songwriter, and YouTube personality from Delhi, India. He is known for his comedy channel on YouTube named BB Ki Vines.

Early life and education 
Bam was born on 22 January 1994 in Vadodara, Gujarat in a Maharastrian family to Avnindra and Padma Bam. Later on, his family moved to Delhi. He attended Green Fields School in Delhi and graduated from Shaheed Bhagat Singh College, Delhi University, with a bachelor's degree in history.

Bam's parents died in 2021 from a COVID-19 infection.

Career 
Bam launched his internet career in uploading a video in which he lampooned a news reporter who asked a woman insensitive questions regarding the death of her son due to the Kashmir floods. The video went viral in Pakistan, inspiring Bam to create his own YouTube channel in June 2015.

BB Ki Vines 
BB Ki Vines is a YouTube channel whose 2–12 minute videos depicts the life of an urban teenager, and his whimsical conversations with his friends and family – all played by Bam himself.  He has 25 million subscribers on his YouTube channel and is known for playing characters like Bhuvan, Banchoddas, Sameer Fuddi, Titu Mama, Bablu, Janki, Mrs. Verma, Adrak Baba, Mr. Hola, Papa Maakichu, Detective Mangloo, Dr. Sehgal and  Babli Sir.

The videos are filmed using a front camera on a phone by Bam himself. He originally uploaded his videos to Facebook, and then moved to YouTube.

Works 
In August 2016, Bam released a music video "Teri Meri Kahani". This was followed by "Sang Hoon Tere", "Safar", "Rahguzaar" and "Ajnabee". He also appeared in a short film, Plus Minus, along with Divya Dutt which earned him a Filmfare award. In December 2018, he began a new digital series on YouTube called Titu Talks, that featured Shah Rukh Khan as the first guest.

In 2019, he released the song, "Ajnabee" on his YouTube channel.

In May 2020, Bam uploaded an episode of Titu Talks titled 'Lifeline of Society' in which he interviewed an electrician, house help, farmers, transgenders and milkmen to understand the difficulties they are facing during the COVID-19 lockdown in India.

In January 2021, he released a statement claiming that his uploaded videos had a total number of 3 billion views. In October of the same year, he released the web series Dhindora on YouTube, with eight episodes.

In January 2023, he made his OTT debut with Taaza Khabar. In the same month, he was seen in Amazon miniTV's Rafta Rafta opposite Srishti Rindani.

Media 
In April 2019, Bam featured in the Hindustan Times brunch cover story. In the same year, during July, Bam also featured on Rolling Stone's cover.

In January 2020, Bam featured on Grazia India's cover in collaboration with Puma. In the same month, he made his presence at the World Economic Forum and the next month, he featured in Forbes 30 Under 30 list in the "Digital Content Creators" category.

In October 2021, Bam again featured in the Hindustan Times brunch cover story.

Filmography

Television

Web series

Short films

Music videos

Discography

Awards and nominations

See also 
 List of YouTubers
 List of Indian Comedians
 List of Indian YouTubers

References

External links 

Indian YouTubers
Living people
Indian male comedians
Musicians from Delhi
1994 births
Comedy YouTubers
Music YouTubers